Adam Roscrow (born 17 February 1995) is a Welsh semi-professional footballer who plays for Bala Town, on loan from Cymru Premier club The New Saints, as a striker.

Club career
Roscrow played youth football for Swansea City, before joining Llantwit Major. Roscrow subsequently played for Neath, Llantwit Major and Pontardawe Town, before signing for Cardiff Metropolitan University in 2014. At Cardiff Met, Roscrow scored 34 Welsh Premier League goals in 79 appearances. In June 2019, Roscrow moved to England, signing for AFC Wimbledon. He scored his first goal for Wimbledon in an EFL Trophy tie against Charlton Athletic on 1 September 2020.

In January 2021, Roscrow joined The New Saints on a three-and-a-half-year deal for an undisclosed, club record fee.

In June 2021, Roscrow returned to Cardiff Metropolitan University on a season-long loan. In September 2022 he moved on loan to Bala Town.

International career
On 20 March 2018, Roscrow made his Wales C debut against England C at Barry Town United's Jenner Park Stadium in a 3–2 defeat for the Welsh team. In the return fixture at Moor Lane, Salford, Roscrow scored Wales' second equaliser in a 2–2 draw.

References

1995 births
Sportspeople from the Vale of Glamorgan
Living people
Welsh footballers
Neath F.C. players
Pontardawe Town F.C. players
Cardiff Metropolitan University F.C. players
AFC Wimbledon players
The New Saints F.C. players
Cymru Premier players
English Football League players
Wales semi-pro international footballers
Association football forwards
Alumni of Cardiff Metropolitan University
Swansea City A.F.C. players
Llantwit Major F.C. players
Bala Town F.C. players